Shahrake Nahal va Bzar (also Romanized as Vabẕar) in the 9th Distric of Karaj, Alborz Province, Iran. At the 2006 census, its population was 2,832, in 785 families.

References 

Populated places in Karaj County